The Szentgyörgyi, also Szentgyörgyi és Bazini, was a noble family of the Kingdom of Hungary in the 13-16th centuries. The ancestor of the family, Thomas descended from the gens ("clan") Hont-Pázmány and he was the head (ispán) of Nyitra County around 1208. The family was named after its two castles, Szentgyörgy and Bazin, built in the 12th century. The possession of the castles ensured that the family could maintain its aristocratic status even among the anarchic conditions of the kingdom during the period between 1290 and 1320. In 1459, the members of the family became counts of the Holy Roman Empire; and afterwards, they were mentioned as counts even in documents issued by the Kings of Hungary although this title was not recognised in the kingdom at that time.

Notable members of the family 
Count Zsigmond Szentgyörgyi de Szentgyörgy et Bazin (?-1493) was appointed as Master of the Cup-bearers (pohárnokmester), together with Simon Cudar, in 1456. Later, he became a supporter of the Emperor Frederick III, a claimant for the crown against King Matthias I of Hungary, between 1459 and 1463. Following the Peace of Wiener Neustadt (19 July 1463), he and his brothers accepted the rule of King Matthias, who appointed him (together with his brother, John and Bertold Ellerbach) to Voivod of Transylvania in 1465. The nobles of Transylvania rebelled against King Matthias, who had introduced new taxes, in 1467 and he allied himself with them. However the king suppressed the revolt soon after. Sigismund was allowed to keep his possessions, but he was deprived of his office.

Count János Szentgyörgyi de Szentgyörgy et Bazin (?-1492), Count Sigismund's brother, was also a supporter of the Emperor Frederick III until 1463. King Matthias, who appointed him (together with his brother, Sigismund and Bertold Ellerbach) to Voivod of Transylvania in 1465. The nobles of Transylvania, who rebelled against King Matthias, were planning to offer the crown to John  in 1467. But King Matthias lead his troops to the province and quickly suppressed the revolt. John surrendered without resistance and he, like his brother, was allowed to keep his possessions. He too was deprived of his office.

See also
List of titled noble families in the Kingdom of Hungary

Sources 
 Markó, László: A magyar állam főméltóságai Szent Istvántól napjainkig - Életrajzi Lexikon (means: "The High Officers of the Hungarian State from Saint Stephen to the Present Days - A Biographical Encyclopedia"); Magyar Könyvklub, 2000, Budapest; .
 Engel, Pál: Magyarország világi archontológiája (1301-1457) (means: "The Temporal Archontology of Hungary (1301-1457)"); História - MTA Történettudományi Intézete, 1996, Budapest; .

External links 
 

Voivodes of Transylvania
Hungarian nobility
Hont-Pázmány (genus)